Concierto de Aranjuez is a studio album by jazz harpist Dorothy Ashby released via the Philips Records label in 1984. The record is her final album as a leader.

Track listing

Credits
Harp – Dorothy Ashby
Illustration – Yōko Ochida
Design – Naoe Arano
Credits for Concierto de Aranjuez adapted from liner notes.

References

External links
A Dorothy Ashby Discography

Dorothy Ashby albums
1984 albums
Philips Records albums